"Detroit" is a song by Scottish rock band Whiteout, released as their third single in 1994 (see 1994 in music). Although it was not part of the band's debut album Bite It (1995) on its initial release, there is an expanded edition available which has "Detroit" added as a 13th track. The B-side "Dee Troyt" is a slowed-down, almost acoustic version of the single's title track with some alternate lyrics and layered harmonies reminiscent of The Beach Boys. The second B-side, "Just Passin' Through, Kid"—a country-esque instrumental song—also appeared as the last track on the Japanese EP No Time.

Track listing
CD and 12" vinyl:
"Detroit" – 4:38
"Just Passin' Through, Kid" – 3:39
"Dee Troyt" – 4:05

7" vinyl and cassette:
"Detroit" – 4:38
"Dee Troyt" – 4:05

All songs written by Carroll/Lindsay/Smith/Jones

Personnel
Andrew Jones – vocals
Eric Lindsay – guitar, backing vocals
Paul Carroll – bass, backing vocals
Stuart Smith – drums

Additional personnel
Those Sweet Soul Swinging Singing Sisters Deborah & Maria – backing vocals on "Detroit"
Brian Oblivion – slide guitar on "Just Passin' Through, Kid"

Production
Production: Oransay Avenue and Kenny Paterson (track 1)
Production: Oransay Avenue and Brian O'Shaughnessy (tracks 2 and 3)
Engineering and mix: Kenny Paterson at Park Lane Studio (track 1)
Engineering and mix: Brian O'Shaughnessy at Bark Studio (tracks 2 and 3)
Assistant engineer: Alex Jones (tracks 2 and 3)
Mastering: Porkey's
Cover design: George Miller
Photography: Elaine Constantine

Chart positions

References

Whiteout (band) songs
1994 singles
1994 songs